The 2005 Australian Production Car Championship was a CAMS sanctioned national motor racing title open to Group 3E Series Production Cars. It was organised by the Production Car Association of Australia and was the 12th Australian Production Car Championship. The title was won by Colin Osborne driving a Toyota Celica.

Race calendar
The championship was contested over a seven round series with three races per round. Race 1 at each round utilised a mass standing start and Races 2 and 3 at each round featured a handicap standing start.

 Note: Hocking was subsequently disqualified from Round 2 due to illegally modified suspension components

Points system
Points for class and outright were awarded on race results as follows:

In addition, the fastest competitor in each Class in Qualifying was awarded 3 points towards both class and outright.

Race 1 at each round had points awarded for class titles only and Races 2 and 3 at each round had points awarded for both class and outright titles.
			
Competitors registered as “Trophy” competitors are not eligible to score points in the championship.

Championship results

References

External links
 Official PCAA website at wayback.archive.org
 2005 Australian Production Car Championship images at www.v8central.com 

Australian Production Car Championship
Production Car Championship